The county of Northamptonshire
is divided into 7 parliamentary constituencies
- 2 borough constituencies
and 5 county constituencies.

Constituencies

2010 boundary changes
Under the Fifth Periodic Review of Westminster constituencies, the Boundary Commission for England decided to increase the number of seats which covered Northamptonshire from 6 to 7, with the creation of South Northamptonshire, resulting in major changes to Daventry and Northampton South.

Proposed boundary changes 
See 2023 Periodic Review of Westminster constituencies for further details.

Following the abandonment of the Sixth Periodic Review (the 2018 review), the Boundary Commission for England formally launched the 2023 Review on 5 January 2021. Initial proposals were published on 8 June 2021 and, following two periods of public consultation, revised proposals were published on 8 November 2022. Final proposals will be published by 1 July 2023.

The commission has proposed retaining the current number of constituencies in Northamptonshire, as detailed below, with boundary changes to reflect changes to ward boundaries following the reorganisation of local government authorities within the county and to bring the electorates within the statutory range. It is proposed that Corby is renamed Corby and East Northamptonshire.

Containing electoral wards from North Northamptonshire

 Corby and East Northamptonshire
 Daventry (part)
 Kettering
 South Northamptonshire (part)
 Wellingborough

Containing electoral wards from West Northamptonshire

 Daventry (part)
 Northampton North
 Northampton South
 South Northamptonshire (part)

Results history
Primary data source: House of Commons research briefing - General election results from 1918 to 2019

2019 
The number of votes cast for each political party who fielded candidates in constituencies comprising Northamptonshire in the 2019 general election were as follows:

Percentage votes 

11974 & 1979 - Liberal Party; 1983 & 1987 - SDP-Liberal Alliance

* Included in Other

Seats

Maps

Historical representation by party
A cell marked → (with a different colour background to the preceding cell) indicates that the previous MP continued to sit under a new party name.

1885 to 1918

1918 to 1950

1950-1983

1983-present

See also
 List of parliamentary constituencies in the East Midlands (region)

Notes

References

Northamptonshire
 
Parliamentary constituencies